Till We Meet Again may refer to:

"Till We Meet Again" (1918 song), a popular 1918 song by Richard A. Whiting and Raymond B. Egan
Till We Meet Again (1922 film), a 1922 silent American melodrama film
Till We Meet Again (novel), a 1988 novel
Judith Krantz's Till We Meet Again, a 1989 television miniseries based on the novel
'Til We Meet Again, a 1940 film starring Merle Oberon and George Brent
Till We Meet Again (1936 film), directed by Robert Florey
Till We Meet Again (1944 film), directed by Frank Borzage
Till We Meet Again (2016 film), directed by Bank Tangjaitrong
Till We Meet Again (2019 film), directed by Steven Ma
Till We Meet Again (2021 film), directed by Giddens Ko
Till We Meet Again, an album by The Machine
"Till We Meet Again", a 1991 single by Inner City
"Till We Meet Again", a song from the album John P. Kelly
"Till We Meet Again", a song from the album Chicago VIII
"Till We Meet Again", a song from the album Kirk Franklin and the Family
"Till We Meet Again", a song from the album Ceremony of Opposites
"Till We Meet Again", a duet by Tetuzi Akiyama and Jason Kahn
"Till We Meet Again", ending theme of Canadian show Don Messer's Jubilee
"Till We Meet Again (Singaporean TV series)", a Singaporean Chinese drama by Mediacorp Channel 8

See also
 We'll Meet Again (disambiguation)